Bullpitt! was a short-lived Australian television comedy series which screened in 1997 to 1998 on the Seven Network, reprising the main character in the 1980s sitcom Kingswood Country. It was written by Gary Reilly and Tony Sattler. 

Bullpitt! saw the return of the character Ted Bullpitt, portrayed by (Ross Higgins) who is now single and retired, living in a retirement home. He is still complaining and repeating many of his catchphrases from Kingswood Country such as "Pickle me grandmother!". Also in the cast Elaine Lee, Peter Whitford, Bruce Spence, Vanessa Downing, Jacqueline Brennan and Kirstie Hutton. The series, like its predecessor, featured many well-known Australian actors in guest cameo roles. It was produced by RS Productions.

In 1998, the show was nominated at the Logies for Most Popular Comedy program. However it lost to sketch comedy Full Frontal.

13 of the 26 episodes of the show have been released on DVD under the title The Best of Bullpitt! Volume 1.

References

External links
 

Australian comedy television series
Australian television sitcoms
Seven Network original programming
1997 Australian television series debuts
1998 Australian television series endings
Television shows set in New South Wales